Zalesie Golczowskie  is a village in the administrative district of Gmina Klucze, within Olkusz County, Lesser Poland Voivodeship, in southern Poland.

The village has an approximate population of 300.

References

Zalesie Golczowskie